Nina Høiberg (born 17 February 1956) is a Danish chess player and Woman International Master (WIM, 1985). She is an eight-times winner of the Danish Women's Chess Championship.

Biography
From the mid 1970s to the early 1990s, Nina Høiberg is one of the leading chess players in the Denmark. Eight times she won the Danish Women's Chess Championships: 1974, 1976, 1977, 1978, 1986, 1991, 1992, and 1993.

Nina Høiberg three times participated in the Women's World Chess Championship Interzonal Tournaments:
 In 1985, at Interzonal Tournament in Zheleznovodsk ranked 9th place;
 In 1987, at Interzonal Tournament in Tuzla shared 6th-7th place with Zsuzsa Verőci;
 In 1990, at Interzonal Tournament in Genting Highlands shared 9th-10th place with Nana Alexandria.

Nina Høiberg played for Denmark in the Women's Chess Olympiads:
 In 1976, at first board in the 7th Chess Olympiad (women) in Haifa (+3, =3, -6),
 In 1978, at first board in the 8th Chess Olympiad (women) in Buenos Aires (+7, =6, -1),
 In 1988, at first board in the 28th Chess Olympiad (women) in Thessaloniki (+7, =4, -3),
 In 1990, at first board in the 29th Chess Olympiad (women) in Novi Sad (+7, =6, -1),
 In 1994, at first board in the 31st Chess Olympiad (women) in Moscow (+7, =5, -2),
 In 2002, at first board in the 35th Chess Olympiad (women) in Bled (+2, =3, -4).

Nina Høiberg played for Denmark in the European Team Chess Championships:
 In 1992, at first board in the 1st European Team Chess Championship (women) in Debrecen (+3, =0, -5),
 In 2015, at first board in the 11th European Team Chess Championship (women) in Reykjavik (+2, =3, -3).

In 1985, she was awarded the FIDE Woman International Master (WIM) title.

References

External links
 
 
 

1956 births
Living people
Danish female chess players
Chess Woman International Masters
Chess Olympiad competitors